Dicks Butte is a summit in Mendocino County, California, in the United States.

References

Mountains of Mendocino County, California
Mountains of Northern California